World War II was a global war that lasted from 1939 to 1945.

World War II may also refer to:

 World War II (series), a book series by Chris Lynch
 World War II, a magazine published by World History Group